Parkside Elementary School may refer to:

Parkside Elementary School (Prince Edward Island), opened in 1853
Parkside Elementary School, Spotsylvania, Virginia in the Spotsylvania County Public Schools district
Parkside Elementary School (Blackwell, Oklahoma), listed on the NRHP in Oklahoma, in Kay County
Parkside Elementary School (Columbus, Indiana), built in 1962 by The Architects' Collaborative
Parkside Elementary School (Murray, Utah), Located next to Murray Park in Utah.
Parkside Elementary School (Coral Springs, Florida)

See also
Parkside School (disambiguation)
Parkside (disambiguation)